Talara mesospila is a moth in the subfamily Arctiinae. It was described by Harrison Gray Dyar Jr. in 1914. It is found in Panama.

References

Arctiidae genus list at Butterflies and Moths of the World of the Natural History Museum

Moths described in 1914
Lithosiini